Wyne or Wynne is a tribal surname in Punjab, Pakistan, associated with the Jat tribe.

Notable people
Begum Majeeda Wyne ( 2013 – 2018) Pakistani politician and former member of National Assembly of Pakistan
Ghulam Haider Wyne former Chief Minister of Punjab, Pakistan from 1990 to 1993
General Khalid Shameem Wynne, Pakistan Armed Forces
 Ehsan Wyne, a politician from Punjab, Pakistan

References

External links

Surnames
Social groups of Punjab, Pakistan